PCOE, PCoE or P.C.o.E. may refer to:

 Parshvanath College of Engineering, an engineering college located in Thane (west) in Maharashtra state of India, and affiliated to the University of Mumbai.
 Patton College of Education in Athens, Ohio, affiliated with Ohio University.
 Spanish Communist Workers' Party (1921), a minor communist political party founded in 1921 in Spain.
 Spanish Communist Workers' Party (1973), a minor communist political party founded in 1973 in Spain.
 Pharmacy Centric Order Entry, used for electronically prescribing of medications>